A furrow profilometer is used for the measurement of the cross-sectional geometry of furrows and corrugations, and is important in furrow assessments. For each furrow, the cross-sectional geometry should be measured at two to three locations before and after the irrigation. A profilometer for determining the cross-sections of furrows is shown in Figure. Individual scales located on the horizontal rod of the profilometer provide data to plot furrow depth as a function of the lateral distance and the data can be numerically integrated. This gives geometric relationships such as area verses depth, wetted perimeter versus depth and top-width verses depth.

References 

Measuring instruments